Makris (Greek: Μακρής) is a surname of Greek origin which means long. The female equivalent is Makri (Greek: Μακρή). The name "Makris" may refer to one of the following people:

 Andreas Makris (1930-2005), Greek-American composer
 Antonis Makris (born 1981), Cypriot footballer
 Constantine Makris, Greek-American cinematographer, television director and television producer
 Cynthia Makris (born 1956), American soprano opera singer
 Dimitrios Makris (c.1772-1841), Greek military commander and fighter of the 1821 revolution
 Dimitrios Makris (politician) (1910-1982), former Interior Minister of Greece
 Dionysis Makris (born 1982), Greek singer
 George Makris (1920-2005), American college football coach
 Georgios Makris (born 1984), Greek footballer
 Memos Makris (1913-1993), Greek sculptor
 Nikolaos Makris (1829-1911), Greek soldier and politician
 Orestis Makris (1898-1975), Greek actor and tenor
 Thomas Makris (born 1978), Greek footballer
 Vassilis Makris (born 1958), Greek photographer

It may also refer to:

 Makri, an island in western Greece
 Makris, an old name for the island of Ikaria, eastern Greece
 Makri, Evros, a village in northern Greece 
 Nea Makri, a town in Attica, Greece

See also 
 Kitsos Makris Folklore Museum
 Mackris

Greek-language surnames